Elysia Rotaru (born November 9, 1984) is a Canadian actress known for playing Taiana Venediktov in Arrow.

Biography
Rotaru was born in Vancouver to Romanian parents and is fluently bilingual in English and Romanian. From a young age she took dance classes and was involved in school plays as well as piano recitals. She enrolled at Simon Fraser University for a career in psychology, but in the middle of the program she changed to theatre, earning a degree in Fine Arts with a specialty in theatre. She also studied  traditional Chinese medicine.

Career
Rotaru debuted in 2008 as a guest star on an episode of the USA Network series, Psych, this was followed by appearances in television series such as Eureka of SyFy and Smallville and Supernatural on The CW. In 2010, Rotaru was given a recurring role in Hellcats, where she played Betsy. She also starred in the film Diary of a Wimpy Kid: Rodrick Rules where she played Ingrid, a main character in the fictional horror movie The Foot.

In 2015, she appeared as a guest star on Motive, a television series broadcast on ABC and on the CW's iZombie. She temporarily voiced Sabine Wren on Disney XD's Lego Star Wars: Droid Tales. On August 10, 2015, Rotaru was cast in the TV show Arrow as Taiana Venediktov, a love interest for Stephen Amell's character, Oliver Queen, during the flashback sequences.

Filmography

Film

Television

Video games

Web

References

External links 

 

Canadian television actresses
Canadian film actresses
Canadian people of Romanian descent
Actresses from Vancouver
1984 births
Living people